Christopher Laurie "Kit" Malthouse (born 27 October 1966) is a British politician and businessman who served as Secretary of State for Education from 6 September to 25 October 2022.  A member of the Conservative Party, he previously served as Chancellor of the Duchy of Lancaster from July to September 2022. He has served as Member of Parliament (MP) for North West Hampshire since 2015.

Malthouse served on the Westminster City Council from 1998 to 2006 and was Deputy Council Leader from 2004 to 2006. He served as a Conservative member of the London Assembly for West Central from 2008 to 2016. He represented the City of Westminster, the London Borough of Hammersmith and Fulham, and the Royal Borough of Kensington and Chelsea. He served under then-Mayor of London Boris Johnson as Deputy Mayor for Policing from 2008 to 2012 and Deputy Mayor for Business and Enterprise from 2012 to 2015.

Malthouse was elected as Member of Parliament for North West Hampshire at the 2015 general election. Following the 2018 cabinet reshuffle, Malthouse was appointed Parliamentary Under-Secretary of State at the Department for Work and Pensions by Prime Minister Theresa May. After Dominic Raab was appointed Brexit Secretary, Malthouse served as Minister of State for Housing and Planning from 2018 to 2019. In July 2019, after Johnson succeeded May as Prime Minister, Malthouse was appointed Minister for Crime, Policing and the Fire Service. In the 2020 cabinet reshuffle, he was appointed Minister of State for Crime and Policing at the Home Office and the Ministry of Justice, before being promoted to Chancellor of the Duchy of Lancaster during the July 2022 government crisis.

Early life
Christopher Laurie Malthouse was born in the Aigburth suburb of Liverpool on 27 October 1966, the son of Susan and John Christopher Malthouse. He was educated at Sudley County Primary, a state school, and Liverpool College, then a private school. He studied politics and economics at Newcastle University.

Business career
Malthouse trained to be a chartered accountant at Touche Ross & Company, qualifying in 1995. He then left and worked as Finance Director of the Cannock Group. He led the management buyout of the part of that group called County Holdings and became chairman of the company.

Political career

Westminster City Council (1998–2006)
Malthouse's first run for office was to represent the constituency of Liverpool Wavertree in the 1997 general election. The seat, which had been recreated after being abolished following the 1979 general election, was easily won by Labour candidate Jane Kennedy, who took 29,592 votes (64.4%). Malthouse came third with 4,944 votes (10.8%), behind Liberal Democrat candidate Richard C. Kemp.

Malthouse was elected to Westminster council in May 1998, representing St George's ward in the Pimlico area of central London. Following boundary changes, he was re-elected in May 2002 for Warwick ward, which is also in Pimlico. Malthouse was appointed as Chief Whip of the Conservative Group, and following a change of leader to Sir Simon Milton, he was appointed Chairman of the Social Services Committee. Two years later, he was elected Deputy Leader of the Council and became Cabinet Member for Finance.

He retired from Westminster City Council at the May 2006 local elections. Malthouse challenged the results of the 2001 population census, which he said seriously underestimated the population of the City of Westminster. Following a two-year battle with the Office for National Statistics, the City of Westminster population was revised upwards by 10% and a review of future census methodology was commissioned.

Malthouse argued against the introduction of the London congestion charge, opposing it on the grounds that the idea should not be first introduced in the most populous city in England, and that London was already one of the most expensive cities to live in.

As Deputy Leader of Westminster Council, Malthouse was responsible for agreeing to a £12.3 million settlement with Shirley Porter over the £27 million surcharge, eventually raising to £42 million in costs and interest, imposed on her as a result of the Homes for Votes gerrymandering fraud scandal.

First term as a member of the London Assembly (2008–2012)
On 26 March 2007, he was selected as the Conservative candidate for the London Assembly seat of West Central. The Assembly elections took place on 1 May 2008, and Malthouse received 53% of the vote. He was appointed Deputy Mayor for Policing two days later.

Deputy Mayor for Policing (2008–2012)
Malthouse was appointed Deputy Mayor of London for Policing by Mayor Boris Johnson with effect from 6 May 2008. In October 2008 he was appointed Vice Chairman of the Metropolitan Police Authority by Johnson. Malthouse was a member of the board of the Association of Police Authorities, and the London Regional Resilience Forum. He was also involved in the Ministerial Steering Group of the London Criminal Justice Partnership.

Malthouse has introduced Met Forward, the Authority's strategic mission for London's police.  Alongside the Mayor of London and the then Deputy Commissioner of Metropolitan Police, Malthouse released ‘Time for Action’ on 3 November 2008 in response to escalating concerns about youth violence in London. Malthouse campaigned against dangerous dogs across London.   He also campaigned for changes to the dangerous dogs legislation to introduce tougher punishments and worked with the CPS to reduce the long delays in the court process to reduce the kenneling costs.

Malthouse campaigned against the presence of prostitution cards in telephone kiosks across London. He also devised the 2010 program 'The Way Forward – a plan for London to tackle violence against women and girls'. In March 2012, Malthouse was urged to resign by Labour MP Chris Bryant for reportedly saying too many police resources were allocated to the investigation into press phone hacking.

While Deputy Mayor of London, Malthouse expressed concerns about the growing numbers of foxes and said: "People are afraid to let their small children play outside because of them. They are more and more worried about the number of foxes as numbers continue to grow." Following his election to Parliament, he stated that he would vote to repeal the Hunting Act 2004, which bans the hunting of foxes with dogs.

Member of Parliament for North West Hampshire (2015–present)
On 4 July 2014 it was announced that Malthouse would be selected as the Conservative candidate in the 2015 general election for the North West Hampshire constituency. The seat had been occupied by Sir George Young since 1997, who announced in 2013 that he would retire in 2015. In March 2015 Malthouse resigned his position as Deputy Mayor of London to concentrate on his parliamentary campaign; the office remained vacant until 2016. He won the seat in North West Hampshire with a majority of 23,943.

In March 2016, Malthouse was asked by Andover's MS Society to step down from his role as a patron. The charity felt he was no longer suitable for the role as he had recently voted to cut ESA to the same level as JSA for those in the Work Related Activity Group (WRAG).

He served as Minister of State for Family Support in 2018 and Minister of State for Housing and Planning from 2018 to 2019. Malthouse was credited as the convener of an agreement between two Conservative party factions on Brexit which aimed to rewrite the Irish backstop. The House of Commons voted down the agreement in March 2019 after EU negotiators criticised it as unrealistic. On 27 May 2019, Malthouse announced that he was standing in the Conservative Party leadership election to replace Theresa May. On 4 June 2019, Malthouse announced that he was withdrawing from the contest.

In July 2019, Prime Minister Boris Johnson appointed Malthouse to the position of Minister for Policing, succeeding Nick Hurd.

In addition to his role as Minister of State for Policing, Malthouse took on additional responsibilities as a Minister of State at the Ministry for Justice.

In July 2022, Malthouse was appointed Chancellor of the Duchy of Lancaster. In July 2022, Malthouse chaired a COBRA meeting of the civil contingencies committee to discuss the escalating heat waves in the United Kingdom. After the meeting, he stated "if people don’t have to travel, this may be a moment to work from home."

In September 2022, he was appointed Secretary of State for Education, serving in that role until shortly after Liz Truss resigned on 25 October 2022.

Personal life 
Malthouse married Tracy-Jane Newall in 1996, and they had a son before divorcing in 2005. He married Juliana Fahra in 2007, and they have one son and one daughter together.

Honours
Maltouse was sworn in as a member of Her Majesty's Most Honourable Privy Council on 20 September 2021 at Balmoral Castle, giving him the honorific prefix of "The Right Honourable" for life.

Notes

References

External links
Official website

1966 births
Alumni of Newcastle University
Conservative Party (UK) councillors
Conservative Party (UK) MPs for English constituencies
Councillors in the City of Westminster
Businesspeople from Liverpool
Living people
Conservative Members of the London Assembly
People educated at Liverpool College
People from Aigburth
UK MPs 2015–2017
UK MPs 2017–2019
UK MPs 2019–present
Ministers of State for Housing (UK)
Members of the Privy Council of the United Kingdom
Chancellors of the Duchy of Lancaster
British Secretaries of State for Education